The Dark Mod is a free and open-source software first-person stealth video game, inspired by the Thief series by Looking Glass Studios. The game provides the basic framework and tools (engine, assets, models, and editor) for more than 160 fan-made missions, including several multi-mission campaigns. The Dark Mod was first released in 2009 as a total conversion mod for Doom 3. Version 2.0 was released in October 2013 as a standalone game using the open-source id Tech 4 game engine.

Gameplay 
The Dark Mod takes place in a classic gothic steampunk world. This includes a crossover of elements of fantasy, the Late Middle Ages, the Victorian era and the Industrial Revolution. Although set in a very similar world to that of the original Thief series, the mod does not use any of the original Thief intellectual property.

The player is an agile thief in a hostile world. He has to use his equipment and the environment to avoid guards, traps, creatures or other threats. His equipment includes a blackjack, water arrows, holy water, flashbombs, mines, and more. Since the player has only a limited fighting capability, he is supposed to sneak and hide in dark, mostly avoiding combat. The plot and mission goals are set by the author of the fan mission or campaign.

Development 
The Dark Mod was originally released as a total conversion modification for Doom 3, but with the release of version 2.0 it became completely standalone on the id Tech 4 game engine. The game's source code is licensed under the GNU General Public License 3 and all other non-software components are under Creative Commons BY-NC-SA.

The mod was originally developed as a toolkit. It includes models, sounds, art, tools, and a specialised editor for users to create custom missions. The development of the mod started in 2004, and the first Beta was released in 2008, along with its first mission. In October 2009, v 1.0 was released.  In October 2013 version 2.0 was released as a standalone game that included two missions created by the development team. The current version is v 2.11, and has over 160 fan-made missions available.

The Dark Mod 2.06 includes code from the dhewm3 fork of the id Tech 4 game engine that was ported to 64-bit, etc.
It is now possible to play The Dark Mod as a native 64-bit build on Linux without any 32-bit libraries.

Notable features as of 2.06 64-bit:

 Soft shadows
 Symmetric multiprocessing (SMP) optimizations
 EFX Audio (replacing proprietary EAX)
 FFmpeg video support
 Scrolling menus and GUI scaling options
 Modernized OpenGL invokes, GLSL shaders, and Frame Buffer Object support

Note: As of 2.07, Soft shadows are available in two varieties:
 Blurred shadow volumes with a blurring algorithm similar to PCSS
 Shadow mapping with true PCSS blurring

Other notable 2.07 features:

 HRTF Audio
 AVX Optimizations

Notable features for 2.08:

 Screen Space Ambient Occlusion
 64-bit color FBO
 Material Shaders support GLSL
 Parallax Corrected Cubemap Support (initial)
 GLSL 3.1 core compliance
 Uniform Transforms
 Buffer Object Persistent Mapping

Notable features for 2.10

 Volumetric lights ( God Rays )
 Entity limit raised to over 65K. ( Virtually unlimited )
 Full pre-compressed RGTC \ BC5 compression loading and rendering
 GLFW windows management
 glTexStorage support
 PNG texture loading
 Parallel texture loading
 A Hash Table
 Improved mission management GUI interface
 X-Ray Rendering support

Reception 
The Dark Mod has been featured and reviewed by a number of major game magazines, websites and blogs. Examples include the Dutch magazine PC Game Play, the blog Kotaku, the British magazine PC Gamer, the German magazines PC Games and GameStar, as well as the British gaming website Rock, Paper, Shotgun.

After going standalone the project received additional substantial coverage from Destructoid and Joystiq.

The Dark Mod won PC Gamer UK's Game of the Year award (mod category) for 2013, and has been distributed on several magazine cover DVDs. In 2014 The Dark Mod was named by PCGamer among the "Ten top fan remade classics you can play for free right now".
In 2016, The Dark Mod was ranked as #2 in "The 50 best free PC games" list by PC Gamer.

See also 
 List of open-source games
 List of video games derived from modifications

References

External links 
 
 The Dark Mod Wiki

2009 video games
Linux games
MacOS games
Stealth video games
Doom mods
Windows games
Id Tech games
Creative Commons-licensed video games
Open-source video games
Freeware games